The Nicomekl River springs from the ground in Langley, British Columbia and travels west through the city to Surrey's Crescent Beach, where it empties into Mud Bay, the northernmost section of the Boundary Bay of the Strait of Georgia. It has a total length of 34 km, with a drainage area of 149 km2.

History and origins

The word Nicomekl is from the Halq'emeylem used by the Stó:lō people, meaning "the route to go" or "the pathway." The area from Mud Bay, British Columbia along the Nicomekl river, and portage area to the Salmon River  and Derby, British Columbia was once occupied by Snokomish people, who were largely wiped out by a smallpox epidemic in the 18th century. Surviving members joined the surrounding Kwantlen, Katzie and Semiahmoo peoples.

 
The river was first documented in writing on December 13, 1824, when James McMillan's Hudson's Bay Company expedition used the Nicomekl River to travel inland. They went up the Nikomekl to the portage area to the Salmon River which connected to the Fraser River 50 miles inland. McMillan built the first Fort Langley at that location two and a half years later. John Work, a clerk with the party, described the Nicomekl as thick with willows and with low banks "well wooded with pine, cedar, alder and some other trees." Work also noted signs of there being numerous beavers on the river.

Nicomekl was more navigable than other nearby rivers so was important to Surrey pioneers.

In 1911, Surrey council barred navigation up the Nicomekl and Serpentine rivers due to construction of dams to reclaim land. This ended use of the rivers by steamboats and log booms.

In December 1951, high tides up the Nicomekl and Serpentine rivers combined with gale-force winds to flood 490 hectares of farmland under 1.5 metres of salt water. Repairs cost about $20,000 and the salt residue affected farm production for a few years. In the 1960s, river pollution caused the closure of thriving oyster farming businesses.

Tributaries (listed from the mouth up)
Chantrell Creek
Anderson Creek
Muckle Creek
Pleasantdale Creek
Langley Creek
Newlands Brook

References

External links
Nicomekl Enhancement Society
History of Transportation on the Nikomekl
Paddling the Nikomekl River

Rivers of the Lower Mainland
Langley, British Columbia (district municipality)
Langley, British Columbia (city)
Surrey, British Columbia